Ferdinando Poggi,  often credited as Nando Poggi, was an Italian born actor active between 1958 and 1985. Best known for his role as Castor in the 1963 film Jason and the Argonauts, he also acted in and was stunt coordinator for Clash of the Titans as well as several Italian language films.

Selected filmography
 Kidnapped to Mystery Island (1964)
 Sandokan to the Rescue (1964)
 Sandokan Against the Leopard of Sarawak (1964)

References

Year of birth missing (living people)
Possibly living people
Italian male film actors